Molly on the Shore is a composition of Percy Aldridge Grainger. It is an arrangement of two contrasting Irish reels, "Temple Hill" and "Molly on the Shore" that present the melodies in a variety of textures and orchestrations, giving each section of the band long stretches of thematic and counter melodic material.

It was written in 1907 by Grainger as a birthday gift for his mother, Rose Annie Aldridge. 
Originally composed for string quartet or string orchestra, this piece was arranged in 1920 for wind band by the composer, as well as for orchestra. Fritz Kreisler set it for violin and piano, but Grainger was thoroughly unimpressed, saying that [It] was a thousand times worse than I had fore-weened {i.e. expected}, and I had not fore-weened anything good.

In a letter to Frederick Fennell (who would later go on to create the definitive full score edition of Grainger's Lincolnshire Posy), Grainger says that "in setting Molly on the Shore, I strove to imbue the accompanying parts that made up the harmonic texture with a melodic character not too unlike that of the underlying reel tune. Melody seems to me to provide music with initiative, wheras {sic} rhythm appears to me to exert an enslaving influence. For that reason I have tried to avoid regular rhythmic domination in my music - always excepting irregular rhythms, such as those of Gregorian Chant, which seem to me to make for freedom. Equally with melody, I prize discordant harmony, because of the emotional and compassionate sway it exerts".

"Molly on the Shore" mostly features the woodwind section of the band, especially the clarinets and saxophones. The opening clarinet solo is a common audition excerpt in the key of B-flat major for clarinet, or concert F major for C Flute or Bassoon.

References

External links 

 
 Performance by the United States Marine Band

Compositions by Percy Grainger
Concert band pieces